Ante Rumora (born 4 July 1960 in SFR Yugoslavia) is a Croatian former football defender who played for Dinamo Zagreb.

External links

Ante Rumora at Aussie Footballers
forum.b92.net

1960 births
Living people
Association football defenders
Yugoslav footballers
Croatian footballers
NK Zagreb players
GNK Dinamo Zagreb players
HNK Cibalia players
Sydney United 58 FC players
Yugoslav First League players
National Soccer League (Australia) players
Yugoslav expatriate footballers
Expatriate soccer players in Australia
Yugoslav expatriate sportspeople in Australia
Croatian expatriate footballers
Croatian expatriate sportspeople in Australia
Croatian football managers
Sydney United 58 FC managers
Croatian expatriate football managers
Expatriate soccer managers in Australia